The Australian Medical Students' Association (AMSA) is an independent association of the 17,000 medical students in Australia. AMSA was formed in 1960 in Brisbane, as a conference organised to network medical students from Australia. It has since grown to become the peak representative body for Australia's medical students—serving a mandate to connect, inform and represent medical students in Australia. Its tri-annual Council meetings include representatives from medical societies at each of Australia's 23 medical schools.

AMSA is a member of the International Federation of Medical Students' Associations.

History
In 1960, medical students from around Australia met in Brisbane for their first national conference. Never before had Australian medical students come together as one body to discuss ideas, share information and voice their opinions and concerns. Since then, the Australian Medical Students' Association has grown and evolved into one of Australia's largest student representative bodies.

Past presidents
 2022: Jasmine Davis, The University of Melbourne
 2021: Sophie Keen, Western Sydney University
 2020: Daniel Zou, The University of Melbourne
 2019: Jessica Yang, The University of Western Sydney
 2018: Alex Farrell, The University of NSW
 2017: Rob Thomas, The University of Queensland
 2016: Elise Buisson, The University of Western Sydney
 2015: James Lawler, The University of Newcastle
 2014: Jessica Dean, Monash University
 2013: Benjamin Veness, The University of Sydney
 2012: James Churchill, The University of Melbourne
 2011: Robert Marshall, The University of Western Australia
 2010: Ross Roberts-Thomson, The University of Adelaide
 2009: Tiffany Fulde, The University of New South Wales
 2008: Michael Bonning, The University of Queensland
 2007: Robert Mitchell, Monash University
 2006: Teresa Cosgriff, The University of Melbourne
 2005: Dror Maor, The University of Western Australia
 2004: Matthew Hutchinson, The University of Adelaide
 2003: Nicholas Brown, The University of Queensland

Advocacy

2020 advocacy priorities
National Advocacy Priorities are determined through a National Survey distributed around August. The survey allows medical students to provide input into the national priorities for the following year, and comment on what is most important to them. Each comment is read and national priorities created off that. At the meeting of the third National AMSA Council of each year, AMSA presents the advocacy priorities. For 2020, they are as follows; 
    
National Priorities

 Improving medical student mental health and wellbeing
 Preventing increases in medical student numbers and establishment of new medical schools
 Action on sexual harassment, bullying and discrimination in medicine
 Increasing intake onto specialty training programs that align with workforce demand, with a particular focus on regional and rural areas
 Work collaboratively to improve the health of Australia's Indigenous people (including recruitment and support of Indigenous medical students) 
 Improving the quality of clinical schools and placements for medical students
 Increase the availability of quality internships for all medical students 
 Working collaboratively to minimise the health impacts of climate change through mitigation and adaptation strategies

Annual conferences

AMSA National Convention
Established in 1960, the AMSA National Convention is the largest student-run conference in the world and brings together 1,000 medical students from across Australia and New Zealand. The Convention program consists of four academic days, one sports day including the annual Emergency Medical Challenge and five themed social evenings culminating in the Gala Ball.

AMSA Global Health Conference
Originally known as the Developing World Conference, and established in 2005 by members of the Australian Medical Students' Association, the Global Health Conference is a meeting of medical students from around Australia that aims to fulfill the desire of medical students to discuss broader issues relevant to global health.

The inaugural conference hosted 200 delegates in Sydney, whilst the 2006 conference in Perth saw more than 250 students attend. In 2007, Adelaide hosted over 300 delegates at an event that sold out nationwide in less than 12 hours.

The academic programme is filled with speakers from many disciplines, including workers from Medecins Sans Frontieres, Health Advisors to Non-for-profit organisations, Politicians and many many more; while the social programme allows students to meet like-minded individuals from around the country.

The Global Health Conference aims to educate and empower medical students with knowledge about global health.

The next AMSA Global Health Conference will be held in Adelaide in 2024. The theme of the event 'Inception' embraces the many layers of complexity we must navigate to make change, and inspires the ability to break through them.

AMSA Rural Health Summit

Of AMSA's major conferences, the Rural Health Summit is the newest, having started in 2016. That year it was hosted in Melbourne and known as the Rural Health Colloquium, before taking on the name of Rural Health Summit from 2017 onwards. The Rural Health Summit has a focus on the health related challenges faced by Australia's rural and regional population, and illuminates the opportunities that exist for medical students to pursue a career in rural and regional areas.

Previous locations for The AMSA Rural Health Summit:
 2016: Melbourne (As the AMSA Rural Health Colloquium)
 2017: Wollongong
 2018: Albury
 2019: Cairns
 2020: Armidale

AMSA National Leadership Development Seminar
AMSA's National Leadership Development Seminar (NLDS) is held each year in the nation's capital, Canberra. Running over five days and four nights, the seminar is an exclusive conference on the medical student calendar with only 80-100 students selected to attend. The seminar aims to bring together some of the brightest minds and challenge and develop their leadership and opinions.

Community engagement

Vampire Cup
The Vampire Cup is AMSA's national blood drive run in association with the Australian Red Cross. The 22 Australian medical societies compete for the prestigious cup with the society with the highest number of donations per capita being awarded victory. In 2019, there were 3461 donations nationally with Australian National University (ANUMSS) winning the Vampire Cup for the second year in a row with 79.3% of their cohort donating. James Cook University won the most total donations with a record 845 donations, the most in the history of the competition.

See also
 Australian Medical Association
 International Federation of Medical Students' Associations

References

External links
 amsa.org.au - the website of the Australian Medical Students' Association

Medical and health student organizations
1960 establishments in Australia
Organizations established in 1960